The Long Pine Formation is a geologic formation in Nebraska. It preserves fossils.

See also

 List of fossiliferous stratigraphic units in Nebraska
 Paleontology in Nebraska

References
 
 

Geologic formations of Nebraska
Neogene stratigraphic units of North America